James Adams Stallworth (April 7, 1822 – August 31, 1861) was a U.S. Representative from Alabama.

Born in Evergreen, Alabama, Stallworth attended Old Field Piney Woods Schools.
He engaged as a planter.
He studied law.
He was admitted to the bar in 1848 and commenced practice in Evergreen, Alabama.
He served as member of the State house of representatives 1845–1848.
He served as solicitor for the second judicial circuit of Alabama in 1850 and 1855.
He was an unsuccessful candidate for election in 1854 to the Thirty-fourth Congress.

Stallworth was elected as a Democrat to the Thirty-fifth and Thirty-sixth Congresses and served from March 4, 1857, to January 21, 1861, when he withdrew.
He died near Evergreen, Alabama, August 31, 1861.
He was interred in Evergreen Cemetery.

References

External links 
 

1822 births
1861 deaths
People from Evergreen, Alabama
American planters
Democratic Party members of the United States House of Representatives from Alabama
Democratic Party members of the Alabama House of Representatives
19th-century American politicians